Sumbawanga is a city located in western Tanzania. It is the capital of Rukwa Region and the municipal seat of Sumbawanga Urban District with postcode number 55100 . The district had a population of approximately 150,000 based on the 2002 census. Sumbawanga lies in the territory of the Wafipa Fipa  tribe and so many people speak Kifipa, as well as Kiswahili, the most widely used language of Tanzania.  The name of the town literally translates as "throw away your witchcraft", thought to be a warning from local spiritual "healers" to any bringing in superstitions and practices relating to spiritual healers from other areas. Until the 1980s approximately, Sumbawanga was a place where many witch doctors would be located. Though fewer in numbers, there are still some healers who practice both in town and in the surrounding smaller villages on the plateau. The town has the largest hospital in the region, Rukwa General Hospital, which is government funded, as well as the smaller Dr. Atiman Hospital administrated and run by the Catholic Diocese of Sumbawanga.

The town acts as a supply and commercial center for the Rukwa Region and some governmental agencies are to be found there, notably the transport department for the region. Sumbawanga has both Libori and Moravian conference centres. A modest-size market is in the town centre where local produce may be found. This includes maize, rice, fruit, poultry and fish (from Lake Tanganyika and Lake Rukwa). Many imported plastic goods and electronics are available as well as bicycles and spares.  Although there are several fuel outlets, supply can be quite erratic because of the difficulties of transport from the coast.

The local economy is largely dependent on agriculture and small locally owned businesses. There is very limited industry or production in the town. Significant improvement has been made on the road to Mbeya as it is sealed to enable reliable all-weather access year round. This road, and its continuation north to Mpanda and Tabora or Kigoma, is now passable throughout the year.  The Tanzanian government has had contracts in place for upgrading large sections of these roads.  The town can be reached by flights operated by Auric Air or by bus from Mbeya which lies to the south with train links to the town of Kapiri Mposhi in Zambia, to Dar es Salaam. Rail is also available through Tabora from Mpanda in the north.  Mpanda also has an airport with a 2 km sealed runway.

Education
Sumbawanga has many schools and colleges, including:

Chem Chem Secondary School
Sumbawanga Secondary School
St. Aggrey Chanji High School 
Mazwi Secondary School 
St. Aggrey Teaching College 
Musoma Utalii College
Chem Chem Teaching College
Kanda Secondary School
Mafulala Secondary School
Msakila Secondary School
St.Mary's Colledge

Twin towns/sister cities
 Tifariti, Morocco

In popular culture
 The town was included on the route taken by Ewan McGregor and Charlie Boorman on their 15,000 mile north to south Long Way Down motorcycle adventure in July 2007.

References 

Populated places in Rukwa Region
Regional capitals in Tanzania